Punishment Training Center is a mixed martial arts training camp founded in 1999 by Tito Ortiz.  Also known as Punishment Athletics, the training center is headquartered in Huntington Beach, California, with a training camp located in Big Bear, California.

From the team’s founding until now, the team has maintained a rivalry with the Lion's Den Academy, mostly played out through the three matches between Tito Ortiz and Lion’s Den founder and UFC Hall of Famer Ken Shamrock.

MMA fighters 
Tito Ortiz (Former UFC Light Heavyweight Champion)
Tiki Ghosn (UFC veteran) 
Justin McCully (UFC veteran)
Rob McCullough (Former WEC Lightweight Champion)
Rob Emerson (VFC Bantamweight and Featherweight Champion)
Carlo Prater  (Former PFC Lightweight Champion)
Jake O'Brien (UFC veteran)
Saul Soliz (MMA Trainer)
Ken Pavia (MMA Agent)
 Cris "Cyborg" Justino (Former UFC Women's Featherweight Champion)
Chad Beverly New Era Fighting 2007 World's Toughest 
Ricco Rodriguez (Former UFC Heavyweight Champion)
Quinton "Rampage" Jackson (Former UFC Light Heavyweight Champion)
Phil Baroni
Melvin Guillard
Josh Burkman
Kendall Grove
Matt Hamill 
Jason "Mayhem" Miller
Kay Hansen

External links
 Official Punishment Athletics and Punishment Training Center Website
 Sherdog Team Search
 Team Punishment on the GymDb

Mixed martial arts training facilities
1999 establishments in California

ja:アメリカン・キックボクシング・アカデミー